Central Kilimanjaro, or Central Chaga, is a Bantu language of Tanzania spoken by the Chaga people.

There are several dialects:
 Moshi (Old Moshi, Mochi, Kimochi)
 Uru
 Mbokomu
 Wuunjo (Wunjo, Vunjo, Kivunjo), including Kiruwa, Kilema, Mamba, Moramu (Marangu), Mwika

Moshi is the language of the Chaga cultural capital, Moshi, and the prestige dialect of the Chaga languages.

Bibliography
Dalgish, Gerard M. (1978) 'The syntax and semantics of the morpheme ni in kiVunjo (Chaga)', Kiswahili, 48, 1, 42–56.
Philippson, Gérard (1984) '"Gens des bananeraies" (Tanzanie): contribution linguistique à l'histoire culturelle des Chaga du Kilimanjaro' (Cahier no. 16.) Paris: Editions Recherche sur les civilisations.

References

Languages of Tanzania
Chaga languages